Up Your Alley is the sixth studio album by American rock band Joan Jett and the Blackhearts, released on May 23, 1988 by Blackheart Records and CBS Records in the United States, and by Polydor Records in Europe and Japan, a year and a half after their previous album Good Music (1986). This album contains the single "I Hate Myself for Loving You", which peaked at No. 8 on the Billboard Hot 100, and had been used as the theme song for Sunday Night Football NFL games in America (with altered lyrics, by two singers) during the 2006 and 2007 seasons. The follow-up single "Little Liar" continued Jett's chart success, peaking at No. 19 on the Hot 100 in late 1988/early 1989.

Up Your Alley peaked at No. 19 on the Billboard 200 albums chart and has since been certified Platinum.

Former Rolling Stones guitarist Mick Taylor played the guitar solo on "I Hate Myself for Loving You".

"I Hate Myself for Loving You" was released as the first single, backed with a live version of the Jett composition "Love Is Pain" (the original version of which appears on 1981's I Love Rock 'n Roll). "Little Liar" was the second single, backed with an obscure Jett–Laguna composition "What Can I Do for You", which had been recorded for a movie Jett was set to make in 1979 that was never completed. The song eventually turned up again on the Jett fan-club only CD 1979. For Record Store Day in 2015, the track was included on the limited edition (4000 split color vinyl) LP The First Sessions documenting the first several songs Jett wrote with Kenny Laguna, her newly acquired producer.

Two music videos were shot for "Little Liar", the first, a concept video, feature a slightly confusing storyline with two Jetts (one in white, one in black) interacting. After seeing the result of the first "Little Liar" video, Jett was unhappy with the silliness and visual translation so immediately shot a new live video (synced with the studio version of the song) for this track. The new video captured a more authentic feel with raw live shots combined with cutaways and studio shot closeups of Jett. It was a more stylized live video with Ziggy Stardust-like artistic flourishes.

Joan Jett and the Blackhearts were nominated for a Grammy Award in 1988 for Best Rock Performance by a Duo or Group with Vocal for "I Hate Myself for Loving You".

Track listing

Personnel
Credits are adapted from the album's liner notes.

Joan Jett and the Blackhearts
 Joan Jett – lead vocals, rhythm guitars
 Ricky Byrd – lead guitar, backing vocals
 Kasim Sulton – bass, backing vocals
 Thommy Price – drums

Additional musicians
 The Uptown Horns:
 Crispin Choe – baritone saxophone
 Arno Hecht – tenor saxophone
 Paul Litteral – trumpet
 Robert Funk – trombone
 Ronnie Lawson – keyboards
 Mick Taylor – guitar solo on track 1
 Frank Carillo – guitar; backing vocals
 Kenny Laguna – various instruments; backing vocals
 Desmond Child – backing vocals
 Chuck Kentis – backing vocals
 Louie Merlino – backing vocals
 Paul Carrizzo – backing vocals

Production team
 Kenny Laguna – production on all tracks
 Ric Browde – production on tracks 2, 4-6, 8-11
 Desmond Child – production on tracks 1 and 3
 Thom Panunzio – associate producer; engineering; mixing
 Jay Healy – engineer; mixer on track 5
 Arthur Payson – engineer
 James A. Ball – engineer
 John Aiosa – engineer
 Andrew Spigleman – assistant engineer
 David Cook – assistant engineer
 Rich Travali – assistant engineer
 Roger Talkov – assistant engineer
 Scott Forman – assistant engineer
 Teddy Trewhella – assistant engineer
 Thom Cadley – assistant engineer
 Bob Ludwig – mastering at Masterdisk, New York

Charts

Weekly charts

Year-end charts

Certifications

References

External links
 

Joan Jett albums
1988 albums
Albums produced by Desmond Child
Albums produced by Thom Panunzio
Blackheart Records albums
CBS Records albums
Polydor Records albums